Terminator is an American media franchise created by James Cameron and Gale Anne Hurd. The franchise encompasses a series of science fiction action films, comics, novels and additional media, concerning a total war between Skynet's synthetic intelligence – a self-aware military machine network – and John Connor's Resistance forces comprising the survivors of the human race. Skynet's most famous products in its genocidal goals are the various terminator models, such as the T-800, who was portrayed by Arnold Schwarzenegger from the original Terminator film in 1984. By 2010, the franchise had generated $3 billion in revenue.

Setting

The central theme of the franchise is the battle for survival between the nearly-extinct human race and the world-spanning synthetic intelligence that is Skynet. Skynet is positioned in the first film, The Terminator (1984), as a U.S. strategic "Global Digital Defense Network" computer system by Cyberdyne Systems which becomes self-aware. Shortly after activation, Skynet perceives all humans as a threat to its existence and formulates a plan to systematically wipe out humanity itself. The system initiates a nuclear first strike against Russia, thereby ensuring a devastating second strike and a nuclear holocaust which wipes out much of humanity in the resulting nuclear war. In the post-apocalyptic aftermath, Skynet later builds up its own autonomous machine-based military capability which includes the Terminators used against individual human targets and therefore proceeds to wage a persistent total war against the surviving elements of humanity, some of whom have militarily organized themselves into a Resistance. At some point in this future, Skynet develops the capability of time travel and both it and the Resistance seek to use this technology in order to win the war; either by altering or accelerating past events or by preventing the apocalyptic timeline.

Judgment Day

In the franchise, Judgment Day (a reference to the biblical Day of Judgment) is the date on which Skynet becomes self-aware and its creators panic and attempt to deactivate the network. As a result, Skynet perceives humanity as a threat and chooses to exterminate them. Skynet launches an all-out nuclear attack on Russia in order to provoke a nuclear counter-strike against the United States, knowing this will eliminate its human enemies. Due to time travel and the consequent ability to change the future, several differing dates are given for Judgment Day. In Terminator 2: Judgment Day (1991), Sarah Connor states that Judgment Day will occur on August 29, 1997. However, this date is delayed following the attack on Cyberdyne Systems in the second film.

Judgment Day has various different dates in different timelines of the subsequent films, as well as the television series, creating a multiverse of temporal phenomena. In Terminator 3: Rise of the Machines (2003) and Terminator Salvation (2009), Judgment Day was postponed to July 2003. In Terminator: The Sarah Connor Chronicles (2008–2009), the attack on Cyberdyne Systems in the second film delayed Judgment Day to April 21, 2011. In Terminator Genisys (2015), the fifth film in the franchise, Judgment Day was postponed to an unspecified day in October 2017, attributed to altered events in both the future and the past. Sarah and Kyle Reese travel through time to the year 2017 and seemingly defeat Skynet, but the system core, contained inside a subterranean blast shelter, survives unknown to them, thus further delaying, rather than preventing, Judgment Day. In Terminator: Dark Fate (2019), the direct sequel to Terminator 2: Judgment Day, a date is not given for the new Judgment Day though it is named as such by Grace. As Grace is a ten–year old in 2020 and shown as a teenager in the post-Judgment Day world in flash-forwards throughout the movie, Judgment Day occurs sometime in the early 2020s in this timeline.

Franchise rights
Before the first film was created, director James Cameron sold the rights for $1 to Gale Anne Hurd, who produced the film. Hemdale Film Corporation also became a 50-percent owner of the franchise rights, until its share was sold in 1990 to Carolco Pictures, a company founded by Andrew G. Vajna and Mario Kassar. Terminator 2: Judgment Day was released a year later. Carolco filed for bankruptcy in 1995 and the rights to future Terminator films were ultimately put up for auction. By that time, Cameron had become interested in making a Terminator 3 film. However, the rights were ultimately auctioned to Vajna in 1997, for $8 million. Vajna and Kassar spent another $8 million to purchase Hurd's half of the rights in 1998, becoming the full owners of the franchise. Hurd was initially opposed to the sale of the rights, while Cameron had lost interest in the franchise and a third film.

After the 2003 release of Terminator 3: Rise of the Machines, the franchise rights were sold in 2007 for about $25 million to The Halcyon Company, which produced Terminator Salvation in 2009. Later that year, the company faced legal issues and filed for bankruptcy, putting the franchise rights up for sale. The rights were valued at about $70 million. In 2010, the rights were sold for $29.5 million to Pacificor, a hedge fund that was Halcyon's largest creditor. In 2012, the rights were sold to Megan Ellison for less than $20 million, a lower price than what was previously offered. The low price was due to the possibility of Cameron regaining the rights in 2019, as a result of new North American copyright laws. David Ellison and Skydance Productions produced Terminator Genisys in 2015.

Cameron worked together with David Ellison to produce the 2019 film Terminator: Dark Fate. As the film neared its release, Hurd filed to terminate a copyright grant made 35 years earlier. Under this move, Hurd would again become a 50-percent owner of the rights with Cameron and Skydance could lose the rights to make any additional Terminator films beginning in November 2020, unless a new deal is worked out. Skydance responded that it had a deal in place with Cameron and that it "controls the rights to the Terminator franchise for the foreseeable future".

Films

The Terminator (1984)

The Terminator is a 1984 science fiction action film released by Orion Pictures, co-written and directed by James Cameron and starring Arnold Schwarzenegger, Linda Hamilton and Michael Biehn. It is the first work in the Terminator franchise. In the film, robots take over the world in the near future, directed by the artificial intelligence Skynet. With its sole mission to completely annihilate humanity, it develops android assassins called Terminators that outwardly appear human. A man named John Connor starts the Tech-Com resistance to fight the machines, defeat Skynet and free humanity. With a human victory imminent, the machines' only choice is to send a Terminator back in time to kill John's mother, Sarah Connor and prevent the boy's birth, thereby handicapping the resistance from ever being founded in the first place. With the fate of humanity at stake, John sends soldier Kyle Reese back to protect Sarah Connor and thus ensure his own existence. It was released on October 26, 1984 and grossed $78.4 million worldwide.

Terminator 2: Judgment Day (1991)

Terminator 2: Judgment Day is the 1991 sequel to the original Terminator film and was released by TriStar Pictures. It was co-written, directed and produced by James Cameron and stars Arnold Schwarzenegger, Linda Hamilton, Edward Furlong, Robert Patrick and Joe Morton. After robots fail to prevent John Connor from being born, they try again in 1995, this time attempting to terminate him as a child by using a more advanced Terminator, the T-1000. As before, John sends back a protector for his younger self, a reprogrammed Terminator, who is a doppelgänger to the one from 1984. After years of preparing for the future war, Sarah decides to use the same tactics the robots used on her: preventing Skynet from being invented by destroying Cyberdyne Systems before they create it. It was released on July 3, 1991, to critical acclaim and grossed $523.7 million worldwide. It also won several Academy Awards, one most notably for its then-cutting-edge computer animation. The film was remastered for 3D and re-released in August 2017.

Terminator 3: Rise of the Machines (2003)

Terminator 3: Rise of the Machines, released by Warner Bros. Pictures in North America and Columbia TriStar Film Distributors internationally, is the 2003 sequel to Terminator 2 and is written by John Brancato, Michael Ferris, directed by Jonathan Mostow and starring Arnold Schwarzenegger, Nick Stahl, Claire Danes and Kristanna Loken. As a result of the destruction of Cyberdyne, the Skynet takeover has been postponed, not averted. In an attempt to ensure a victory by the robots, a new Terminator, the T-X, is sent back to terminate the lives of as many of John Connor's future lieutenants as is possible, including his future wife Kate Brewster and also John himself. Kate's father, General Robert Brewster (David Andrews), who is supervising Skynet's development, is also targeted for termination by the T-X. After Connor's future self is terminated by a doppelgänger of his previous protector, Kate reprograms him and sends him back to save them both from the T-X. It was released on July 2, 2003 to generally favorable reviews and grossed $433.4 million worldwide.

Terminator Salvation (2009)

Terminator Salvation is the fourth installment of the Terminator film series and was made by The Halcyon Company and distributed by Warner Bros. Pictures and Columbia Pictures. It was released on May 21, 2009 to mixed reviews and grossed $371.4 million. It was written by John Brancato and Michael Ferris, directed by McG, and stars Christian Bale as John Connor and Sam Worthington (who was personally recommended by James Cameron) as Marcus Wright. Following the events of Terminator 3: Rise of the Machines, after Skynet has destroyed much of humanity in a nuclear holocaust, John struggles to become the leader of humanity as he is destined, while Marcus Wright finds his place in an unfamiliar post-apocalyptic world. In this future, altered by the events of the second film, the T-800 Terminators (Roland Kickinger with CG-rendered facial likeness of Arnold Schwarzenegger) are coming online sooner than expected. The film also stars Anton Yelchin as Kyle Reese, Bryce Dallas Howard, Moon Bloodgood, Common, Michael Ironside and Helena Bonham Carter.

Terminator Genisys (2015)

Terminator Genisys is the fifth installment of the franchise and also serves as a reboot that features the main characters from the first two films created by James Cameron, Gale Anne Hurd and William Wisher, Jr., portrayed by a new cast, with the exception of Arnold Schwarzenegger reprising his role as the eponymous character. Additionally, J. K. Simmons joined the cast as Detective O'Brien, serving as an ally for the film's protagonists. The film was written by Laeta Kalogridis and Patrick Lussier and directed by Alan Taylor. It was made by Skydance Productions and distributed by Paramount Pictures. The story takes place in an alternate reality resulting from a chain of events related to Skynet's (Matt Smith) actions throughout a previous timeline. Prior to this alteration, on the verge of winning the war against Skynet, John Connor (Jason Clarke) sends his trusted right-hand officer Kyle Reese (Jai Courtney) back through time to save his mother's life and ensure his own existence. However, Kyle arrives at an alternate timeline where Skynet had never launched its initial attack in 1997 and Sarah Connor (Emilia Clarke) was brought up by a reprogrammed Terminator (Schwarzenegger), sent by an unknown party to be her guardian ever since childhood. Now Sarah, Kyle and the Guardian need to escape the T-800 Model 101 (Brett Azar with CG-rendered likeness of Schwarzenegger from the first film), the T-1000 (Lee Byung-hun) and Skynet's T-3000, in an attempt to stop Judgment Day from ever happening; while trying to uncover the secrets behind Cyberdyne Systems' new application software: Genisys. Assisting the trio is Detective O'Brien (Simmons), whose investigation into time travelers (especially Terminators) leads him to learn about Skynet and helps the protagonists in their mission to avert Judgment Day. The film was released in the U.S. on July 1, 2015 and grossed $440.6 million worldwide. Its commercial performance was lower than anticipated, resulting in two planned sequels and a spin-off television series being cancelled in favor of Terminator: Dark Fate (2019).

Terminator: Dark Fate (2019)

Terminator: Dark Fate is the sixth installment of the franchise and a direct sequel to Terminator 2: Judgment Day. It is directed by Tim Miller and was released in the U.S. on November 1, 2019. It stars Linda Hamilton and Arnold Schwarzenegger, reprising their roles as Sarah Connor and the Terminator, respectively. The film also stars Mackenzie Davis, Natalia Reyes and Gabriel Luna. Jude Collie and Brett Azar were also cast as a young John Connor and a younger T-800, respectively.

The previous film, Terminator Genisys, had been intended as the first in a new stand-alone film trilogy, but the planned sequels were canceled following the film's disappointing box-office performance. The producer of that film, David Ellison, recruited James Cameron to produce a new film with him, which would become Terminator: Dark Fate.

In the film, the machines send a Terminator, Rev-9 (Luna), back in time to eliminate Dani Ramos (Reyes), whose destiny is linked to the Human Resistance's war against them. The Resistance sends one of their soldiers Grace (Davis) back to protect her and a chain of events lead Grace and Dani to join forces with Sarah Connor and the T-800.

The writers' room included Josh Friedman, creator of the television series Terminator: The Sarah Connor Chronicles. Other writers included David S. Goyer, Justin Rhodes and Billy Ray. The creative team stated that the new film would feature a young 18- to 21-year-old, who could potentially lead the franchise should the first film be successful. Miller made mention of creating a theme park attraction akin to T2 3-D: Battle Across Time should the film prove successful. Because the series deals with time-travel, the film ignores the premise of the last three films and the TV series and is not titled Terminator 6, as it is also a direct sequel to Terminator 2: Judgment Day. Filming began in Isleta del Moro, Almería on June 4, 2018, shooting for a month there, before shooting the rest in the United States.

This film was intended as the first in a new trilogy of Terminator films, but these plans were canceled due to very mixed audience reactions and the film's underperforming box office record.

Television

Terminator: The Sarah Connor Chronicles (2008–2009)

Terminator: The Sarah Connor Chronicles follows Sarah (Lena Headey) and John Connor (Thomas Dekker) as they try to "live under the radar" after destroying Cyberdyne in Terminator 2. Summer Glau plays a Terminator named Cameron and Brian Austin Green plays Derek Reese, the brother of Kyle Reese, both sent back in time to protect the Connors and prevent another Judgment Day.

Future
In February 2021, Netflix announced plans to develop a Terminator anime series with Skydance, Mattson Tomlin and Production I.G. 

In December 2022, James Cameron revealed there were discussions for another possible Terminator film. Cameron has stated if any new Terminator film is made that it may be a reboot of the franchise with no returning cast members from previous installments.

Web series

Terminator Salvation: The Machinima Series (2009)

Set in 2016, years after Judgment Day, Blair Williams (voiced by Moon Bloodgood) is fighting the war against the machines in downtown Los Angeles, while tracking down the computer hacker named Laz Howard (voiced by Cam Clarke) and trying to persuade him to join sides with the resistance.

Terminator Genisys: The YouTube Chronicles (2015)
Terminator Genisys: The YouTube Chronicles was released in three parts on June 22, 2015 to promote the fifth film, produced by Heresy. The web series was directed by Charles Paek and written by Jay Bushman. It features several popular YouTube stars appearing with Arnold Schwarzenegger as the T-800, as they stand together against the T-360 (played by fellow YouTube personality, Toby Turner).

Cast and crew

Principal cast

Additional crew

Reception

Box office performance

Critical and public response

Cultural impact
The Terminator franchise, most notably James Cameron's original films, The Terminator and Terminator 2: Judgment Day, has had a significant impact on popular culture. The film franchise placed #17 on the top 25 greatest film franchises by IGN and is also in the top 30 highest-grossing franchises. According to Rotten Tomatoes, the Terminator franchise is the sixth highest rated franchise on the site behind the Toy Story franchise, the Dollars Trilogy, The Lord of the Rings film trilogy, the Mad Max franchise and the original Star Wars trilogy, but in front of the Indiana Jones franchise.

In 2008, The Terminator was selected for preservation in the National Film Registry by the Library of Congress as being "culturally, historically or aesthetically significant". The American Film Institute (AFI) has also recognized both films on a number of occasions: the line "I'll be back" from The Terminator placed as the 37th-best movie quote, while "Hasta la vista, baby" from Terminator 2 ranked 76th on the same list. The Terminator character from The Terminator was voted the 22nd-greatest villain; meanwhile, the T-800 (of the same likeness) in Terminator 2: Judgment Day was voted the 48th-greatest hero; this is the only time the same character has appeared on the two opposing lists. In the 100 Years...100 series list, the Terminator franchise was voted the 42nd most thrilling. In addition, Terminator 2: Judgment Day ranked 8th on AFI's top 10 list in the science fiction genre.

Both films are the source of numerous pop culture references, such as the use of "I'll be back" in countless other media, including different variations of the phrase by Arnold himself in many of his subsequent films and, in cameo appearances by Robert Patrick, as the T-1000, in Last Action Hero and Wayne's World. The Simpsons have also spoofed both films and the T-1000, in particular, on a number of occasions.

The references are also made when Schwarzenegger was elected as California governor during the recall election, which a newspaper headline said "Davis Terminated". Schwarzenegger was nicknamed "the governator", a portmanteau of governor and Terminator.

Terminator 2 is the only film in the series to garner attention at the Academy Awards, with six nominations and four wins and is rated highly among critics. In 2006 the readers of Total Film rated The Terminator as cinema's 72nd best film and Terminator 2: Judgment Day the 33rd.

The first five Terminator films have had very respectable box office gross, though after James Cameron left the series it saw diminishing returns in subsequent films. The Terminator made $78 million worldwide, far surpassing its $6 million budget and becoming a major sleeper hit. Terminator 2: Judgment Day grossed approximately $520 million globally, becoming a major blockbuster and the top-grossing film of 1991. Terminator 3: Rise of the Machines earning $433 million, making it the seventh highest-grossing film of 2003. Terminator Salvation grossed an estimated $371 million worldwide, a figure below industry expectations. Terminator Genisys grossed $440 million. Terminator: Dark Fate raised approximately $261 million worldwide with an estimated loss of $130 million, becoming both the least successful film in the franchise and a box office bomb in its own right.

Music

Soundtracks

Other media

Video games

Various video games have been released since 1991.

Novels

A series of novels were released from 2001 to 2004, under the name T2.

Comics

The Terminator spin-off comics
In 1988, NOW Comics published an ongoing series with John Connor as the main character in 2031, after sending Kyle Reese back to 1984 to protect his mother. The Terminators in this canon had more human-like endoskeletons and some issues would deal with subordinates of Connor's in the ruins of certain geographic areas. The seventeen issue series was followed by two limited series.

Dark Horse Comics acquired the rights in 1990. In The Terminator (with Tempest added in trade paperbacks to distinguish itself from other comics), a group of human soldiers and four Terminators come to the present, to stop Skynet in differing ways. In the sequel, Secondary Objectives, the surviving Terminator is reprogrammed to destroy another Terminator sent to aid him and kill Sarah Connor. In its sequel, The Enemy Within, a team of human assassins attempt to return to the past and kill a Skynet developer. The 1992 Endgame concludes this arc. Human colonel Mary Randall protects Sarah Connor as she goes into labor.

Dark Horse published a 1992 one-shot written by James Dale Robinson and drawn by Matt Wagner. Here, a female Terminator and a resistance fighter battle for the life of a woman named Sarah Connor, but not the correct one. The comic book had the unusual feature of a physical "pop-up" in one scene.

A 1993 limited series Hunters and Killers, set during the war, has special Terminators created to impersonate leaders in the Russian resistance. Another limited series, published in 1998, follows the misadventures of two malfunctioning Terminators in Death Valley. This set up the following year's comic The Dark Years, set in 2030. In The Dark Years, a Terminator is sent to eliminate John Connor and his mother in 1999. In 2013, Dark Horse released a sequel comic based on the 2009 film Terminator Salvation, entitled Terminator Salvation: The Final Battle.

Malibu Comics published twin series in 1995. One was a sequel to Terminator 2: Judgment Day, in which Sarah and John encounter two Terminators. The other was a prequel that explains the scenario. The conclusions to the series were published in one issue.

Beckett Comics published three series to promote Terminator 3: Rise of the Machines, each consisting of two issues.

Terminator 2: Infinity (later simply Terminator Infinity (2007) comic book series by Dynamite Entertainment, was set in 2033. It was, for two issues, tied into another one of Dynamite's publications, called Painkiller Jane.

Dynamite's continuation, Terminator: Revolution and IDW Publishing's Salvation tie-in comic book were legally possible as the former was specifically based on the Terminator 2 license.

Crossover comics
Terminators have crossed over with RoboCop, Superman and Alien vs. Predator. In RoboCop versus The Terminator (1992) and Superman vs. The Terminator: Death to the Future (2000), the heroes must prevent the war-ravaged future.

In 2000's Alien versus Predator versus The Terminator from Dark Horse, where Skynet, has reactivated farther in the future and is creating an Alien-Terminator hybrid. Ellen Ripley's clone (from Alien Resurrection) and the Predators join forces to stop Skynet.

In 2020, Dark Horse and IDW Publishing published Transformers vs. The Terminator, in which the Autobots and the Decepticons are antagonised by the T-800 as Skynet sends the Terminator back through time to destroy the Cybertronians and restore the future timeline.

Collectible card game

The Terminator Collectible Card Game was released in 2000 by Precedence.

Role-playing Game
First announced in 2020 by Nightfall Games, creators of SLA Industries, The Terminator RPG was released in PDF form in Summer 2022, with a physical version following later in the year.  The game is based on the first film and Dark Horse Comics line of graphic novels and comics.

Theme park attractions

T2-3D: Battle Across Time, a film ride based on the franchise, opened at Universal Studios Florida in 1996.

The ride is presented as an alternate sequel to Terminator 2: Judgment Day and features Arnold Schwarzenegger, Linda Hamilton, Edward Furlong and Robert Patrick reprising their roles as The Terminator, Sarah Connor, John Connor and The T-1000 respectively. James Cameron is one of three directors involved with the attraction and would be the final time he would have any strict involvement in anything with the Terminator name until Terminator: Dark Fate.

Terminator X: A Laser Battle for Salvation operated at various locations beginning in 2009. Terminator Salvation: The Ride operated at California's Six Flags Magic Mountain from 2009 to 2010.

Canceled projects

Terminator Salvation trilogy
In May 2007, the production rights to the Terminator series had passed from the feuding of Andrew G. Vajna and Mario Kassar to The Halcyon Company. The producers of the company hoped to start a new trilogy based on the franchise. However, due to the box office failure of the fourth film and legal troubles, the Salvation trilogy was ultimately cancelled. William Wisher, who co-wrote the first two films, had written material for a potential Terminator 5 and Terminator 6 that would follow on from the events of Terminator Salvation. The two-part story would involve an element of time travel that brings back the deceased character of Sarah Connor, allowing her to interact with Kyle Reese beyond their initial meeting in the first film. Schwarzenegger would also reprise his role for the sixth film. The films would also include new Terminator villains from Skynet. Wisher had written a 24-page film treatment for Terminator 5 and a four-page concept outline for Terminator 6.

Terminator Genisys trilogy
By December 2013, there were plans for Terminator Genisys to be the start of a new trilogy of films. In September 2014, Paramount announced release dates for the two Genisys sequels: May 19, 2017 and June 29, 2018. Terminator Genisys producer David Ellison described the film and its intended trilogy as standalone projects based on Cameron's original Terminator films. Ellison said Terminator Genisys is neither a sequel or a prequel to the previous films, saying: "For us this is Terminator 1, this is not Terminator 5". The sequels to Genisys were tentatively known as Terminator 2 and Terminator 3. The two sequels were to be filmed back to back during nine months of continuous shooting.

The storylines for the two sequels were devised by Genisys writers Kalogridis and Lussier. The trilogy was being planned out before Terminator Genisys began filming, as producers David Ellison and Dana Goldberg wanted the full storyline finished ahead of time rather than having to "figure it out as you go along", stating: "We spent a lot of time breaking that down, and we do know what the last line of the third movie is, should we be lucky enough to get to make it". Production on the sequels was contingent on whether Terminator Genisys would be successful; development of the trilogy stalled in 2015 after the film's disappointing box-office performance. The planned sequels were ultimately cancelled, with Terminator 2 being removed from Paramount's release schedule in January 2016.

The new trilogy would have explained who sent Pops back in time to protect Sarah Connor. In February 2015, Schwarzenegger said he would reprise his role as Pops for the second film in the trilogy, with filming set to begin in 2016. Jai Courtney and Matt Smith would also reprise their respective roles as Kyle Reese and Skynet. J. K. Simmons would have had further involvement in the new trilogy, and Dayo Okeniyi would have a significant role reprising his character Danny Dyson in the second film, which would have focused on John Connor's life after becoming part machine. Jason Clarke said about the cancelled Genisys sequel:

Terminator Genisys–connected television series
By December 2013, Skydance Productions and Annapurna Pictures were developing a new Terminator television series. Ashley Miller and Zack Stentz, who had worked together previously on Terminator: The Sarah Connor Chronicles, were named as writers and executive producers. The series was said to deviate from the franchise's history at a critical moment in 1984's The Terminator and would also integrate with the then-projected film series' direct sequels to Terminator Genisys.

Terminator: Dark Fate trilogy
Plans for a new Terminator film trilogy were announced in July 2017. While working on the story for Terminator: Dark Fate that year, Cameron and the writers envisioned the film as the first in the new trilogy. They also worked out the basic storylines for each planned film.

In October 2019, Cameron said that sequels to Terminator: Dark Fate would further explore the relationship between humans and artificial intelligence, while stating that a resolution between the two feuding sides would be the ultimate outcome. That month, Schwarzenegger said that Cameron would write the Terminator: Dark Fate sequels and that Cameron would begin work on the next film in early 2020, for release in 2022.

Although the events of Terminator: Dark Fate erase Schwarzenegger's T-800 character from existence, Cameron did not rule out the possibility of Schwarzenegger reprising the character: "Look, if we make a shit ton of money with this film [Terminator: Dark Fate] and the cards say that they like Arnold, I think Arnold can come back. I'm a writer. I can think of scenarios. We don't have a plan for that right now, let me put it that way". Natalia Reyes was to reprise her role for a sequel. Hamilton said in October that she would probably reprise her role as well, although she joked that she would fake her own death to avoid appearing in it, saying that making Terminator: Dark Fate "really was hard" because of the physical training she had to undergo. Hamilton later said that she would be happy not to star in another Terminator film, but she kept the possibility open, with a potential exception being that a sequel be done on a smaller scale and budget.

Dark Fate director Tim Miller said in November that he did not expect to return for a sequel. Production of a sequel was contingent on whether Dark Fate was a box-office success. Following the underwhelming performance of Dark Fate at the box-office (with an estimated loss of at least $120 million), sources close to Skydance told The Hollywood Reporter that there are no plans for further films, effectively cancelling the planned Dark Fate trilogy.

See also
 Grandfather paradox
 Time travel in fiction
 List of the highest-grossing media franchises

Notes

References

External links
 
 
 

 
Action film franchises
American film series
Apocalyptic fiction
Post-apocalyptic fiction
Artificial intelligence in fiction
Malware in fiction
Cyborgs in fiction
Fiction about robots
Biorobotics in fiction
Genetic engineering in fiction
Nanotechnology in fiction
Fiction about assassinations
Fiction about time travel
Science fiction film franchises
Sony Pictures franchises
Metro-Goldwyn-Mayer franchises
Lionsgate franchises
Warner Bros. franchises
Paramount Pictures franchises
20th Century Studios franchises
Mass media franchises introduced in 1984
Temporal war fiction
Film series introduced in 1984
Dystopian fiction
Post-apocalyptic literature